A nondispersive infrared sensor (or NDIR sensor) is a simple spectroscopic sensor often used as a gas detector. It is non-dispersive in the fact that no dispersive element (e.g a prism or diffraction grating as is often present in other spectrometers) is used to separate out (like a monochromator) the broadband light into a narrow spectrum suitable for gas sensing. The majority of NDIR sensors use a broadband lamp source and an optical filter to select a narrow band spectral region that overlaps with the absorption region of the gas of interest. In this context narrow may be 50-300nm bandwidth. Modern NDIR sensors may use Microelectromechanical systems (MEMs) or mid IR LED sources, with or without an optical filter.

Principle
The main components of an NDIR sensor are an infrared (IR) source (lamp), a sample chamber or light tube, a light filter and an infrared detector. The IR light is directed through the sample chamber towards the detector. In parallel there is another chamber with an enclosed reference gas, typically nitrogen. The gas in the sample chamber causes absorption of specific wavelengths according to the Beer–Lambert law, and the attenuation of these wavelengths is measured by the detector to determine the gas concentration. The detector has an optical filter in front of it that eliminates all light except the wavelength that the selected gas molecules can absorb.

Ideally other gas molecules do not absorb light at this wavelength, and do not affect the amount of light reaching the detector however some cross-sensitivity is inevitable. For instance, many measurements in the IR area are cross sensitive to H2O so gases like CO2, SO2 and NO2 often initiate cross sensitivity in low concentrations.

The IR signal from the source is usually chopped or modulated so that thermal background signals can be offset from the desired signal.

NDIR sensors for carbon dioxide are often encountered in heating, ventilation, and air conditioning (HVAC) units.

Configurations with multiple filters, either on individual sensors or on a rotating wheel, allow simultaneous measurement at several chosen wavelengths.

Fourier transform infrared spectroscopy (FTIR), a more complex technology, scans a wide part of the spectrum, measuring many absorbing species simultaneously.

Research 
Miniature IR sources based on microelectromechanical systems (MEMS) have been experimentally applied to NDIR systems since 2006 and is useful since 2016. The low energy of MEMS emission means a sensitive detector circuit based on lock-in amplification is needed. Other useful detectors include the photoacoustic gas sensor which use a MEMS microphone to detect IR-gas interactions.

Gases and their sensing wavelengths
Gases do not have a specific sensing wavelength, rather there are regions of the IR spectrum where there are typically many thousands of closely spaced absorption lines. See the Hitran database for more information. 

 O2 - 0.763 μm
 CO2 - 4.26 μm, 2.7 μm, about 13 μm
 CO - 4.67 μm, 1.55 μm, 2.33 μm, 4.6 μm, 4.8 μm, 5.9 μm
 NO - 5.3 μm, NO2 has to be reduced to NO and then they are measured together as NOx; NO also absorbs in ultraviolet at 195-230 nm, NO2 is measured at 350-450 nm; in situations where NO2 content is known to be low, it is often ignored and only NO is measured; also, 1.8 μm
 NO2 - 6.17-6.43 μm, 15.4-16.3 μm, 496 nm
 N2O - 7.73 μm (NO2 and SO2 interfere), 1.52 μm, 4.3 μm, 4.4 μm, about 8 μm
 HNO3 - 5.81 μm
 NH3 - 2.25 μm, 3.03 μm, 5.7 μm
 H2S - 1.57 μm, 3.72 μm, 3.83 μm
 SO2 - 7.35 μm, 19.25 μm
 HF - 1.27 μm, 1.33 μm
 HCl - 3.4 μm
 HBr - 1.34 μm, 3.77 μm
 HI - 4.39 μm
 hydrocarbons - 3.3-3.5 μm, the C-H bond vibration
 CH4 - 3.33 μm,  can also be used, 1.3 μm, 1.65 μm, 2.3 μm, 3.2-3.5 μm, about 7.7 μm
 C2H2 - 3.07 μm
 C3H8 - 1.68 μm, 3.3 μm
 CH3Cl - 3.29 μm
 H2O - 1.94 μm, 2.9 μm (CO2 interferes),   can also be used to avoid interference from CO2, 1.3 μm, 1.4 μm, 1.8 μm
 O3 - 9.0 μm, also 254 nm (UV)
 H2O2 - 7.79 μm
 alcohol mixtures - 
 HCHO - 3.6 μm
 HCOOH - 8.98 μm
 COS - 4.87 μm

Applications 
 Infrared gas analyzer
 Infrared point sensor
 Carbon dioxide sensor

References

External links 
NDIR & CO2 Sensors Explained, The Gas Detector Encyclopedia, Edaphic Scientific Knowledge Base
NDIR Gas Sensor Lamp Selection Application Notes
NDIR Technology for gasoline exhaust 
NDIR detectors for CO&CO2 in internal combustion engine exhaust

Gas sensors
Spectrometers
Infrared spectroscopy
Absorption spectroscopy